A rōnin is a Japanese feudal samurai without a master.

Ronin may also refer to:

Music
 Ronin (band), a four-member hard rock band based in Singapore
 Ronin, a "zen-funk" group led by Nik Bärtsch
 Rōnin I, an album by UK group Unkle
 Rōnin, a song by Ibaraki on the upcoming album Rashomon

Entertainment
 Ronin (film), a 1998 action thriller by John Frankenheimer
 Rounin (TV series), a Philippine TV epic
 Rōnin (DC Comics), a graphic novel by Frank Miller
 Ronin (Marvel Comics), an alias used by several Marvel Comics characters
 Ronin (video game), a 2015 video game by Tomasz Wacławek published by Devolver Digital
 The Ronin, a fictional gang in Saints Row 2
 Ronin, a character from Lego Ninjago: Masters of Spinjitzu and Lego Ninjago: Shadow of Ronin
 Ronin, a Titan class in Titanfall 2 (2016)
 "Ronin" (Hawkeye episode), an episode from the TV series Hawkeye inspired by Marvel Comics
 Ronin (Hawkeye character), a character from the TV series Hawkeye inspired by Marvel Comics

Other uses
 Rōnin (student), a student studying outside of the school system for entrance in a future year
 Ronin Institute, an independent  scholarly institute
 Ronin, Poland, a village
 Ronin Publishing, book publisher specializing in psychedelic and drug literature
 Carlos Newton or The Ronin, mixed martial arts fighter
 TVS Ronin, a motor cruiser by TVS Motor Company

People
 Hiraga Gennai or Tenjiku Rōnin, Edo-period Japanese pharmacologist
 Daniel Perez (better known as "Bugz Ronin"), record producer and songwriter
 Costa Ronin, actor and cinematographer
 Samuil Ronin, Russian social scientist

See also 
 Forty-seven rōnin (disambiguation)
 Green Ronin Publishing, a role-playing game publisher
 Ronin Arts, a role-playing game company
 Ronan the Accuser, a Marvel comics character
 Ronin Warriors, a manga and anime series by Hajime Yatate
 Rurouni Kenshin, manga and anime